Ryan Gibbons (born March 13, 1983) is a former American football offensive guard in the National Football League for the Jacksonville Jaguars, Tampa Bay Buccaneers, Chicago Bears and Dallas Cowboys. He was signed by the Jacksonville Jaguars as an undrafted free agent in 2006. He played college football at Northeastern.

Early years
Gibbons attended Marshfield High School, where he lettered in football and golf. He graduated in 2001.

He accepted a football scholarship from Northeastern University. As a redshirt freshman, he appeared in 12 games with 4 starts, splitting time with Tim Dwyer as the starting left tackle. 

As a sophomore, he started all 12 games, contributing to the team setting a school record with 5,182 total offense yards. As a junior, he started all 11 games, as part of an offensive line that allowed 16 sacks. 

As a senior, he started all 11 games. He finished his college career after playing in 46 games with 36 starts and missing only one contest.

Professional career
Gibbons was signed as an undrafted free agent by the Jacksonville Jaguars after the 2006 NFL Draft on April 30. He was released on September 2 and signed to the practice squad on September 12.

In the spring of 2007, he was allocated by the Jaguars to the Hamburg Sea Devils of NFL Europa. He appeared in 10 games with five starts at offensive guard. He contributed to the team winning World Bowl XV with a 37-28 victory against the Frankfurt Galaxy. He was released by the Jaguars on September 1 and signed to the practice squad on September 2. He was released by the Jaguars on September 20.

On October 2, 2007, he was signed by the Tampa Bay Buccaneers to their practice squad. He was released on November 20.

On November 27, 2007, he was signed to the Chicago Bears practice squad.

On March 5, 2008, he was signed by the Jacksonville Jaguars. He was released on June 16.

On June 23, 2008, he was signed as a free agent by the Dallas Cowboys. He was released by the Cowboys and signed the practice squad on September 10. He was released on September 5, 2009.

References

External links
Dallas Cowboys bio

1983 births
Living people
Players of American football from Massachusetts
American football offensive tackles
American football offensive guards
Northeastern Huskies football players
Jacksonville Jaguars players
Hamburg Sea Devils players
Tampa Bay Buccaneers players
Chicago Bears players
Dallas Cowboys players
People from Marshfield, Massachusetts
Sportspeople from Plymouth County, Massachusetts